Ukki Väinämöinen, born Vasily Leontievich Sidorov, also known as Vaseli Levonen (1855 – 1 January 1942), was a Karelian ideological leader known for his role in the East Karelian uprising.

Life 
Vasily Sidorov was born in 1855, in the Karelian village of Tunguda, then a part of the Russian Empire.

Karelian uprising 

Sidorov was elected as the leader of the Finnish Forest Guerrillas, who had led a conflict against the Russian Bolsheviks and Karelian Labor Commune during the Russian Civil War. Sidorov was a zealous Christian and an anti-communist, and was very popular among the Karelians. Sidorov gained the nickname "Ukki Väinämöinen" from his resemblance to the hero Väinämöinen of Finnish mythology, as both had a short, stocky stature and long beard.

By the end of December 1921, the Karelian rebels, supported by the White Guard, controlled a significant part of Northeast Karelia. In response, Bolshevik leadership formed the Karelian Front led by Alexander Sedyakin, numbering around some 20,000 servicemen. The Bolsheviks captured Ukhta, the rebel stronghold, by mid-February 1922, and the Karelian resistance was finally broken. Ukki Väinämöinen fled to Finland with the other rebels. He died on 1 January 1942 in Vuokatti.

References

Sources

Further reading 

 
 
 

1855 births
1942 deaths
Russian Karelian people
Anti-communists from the Russian Empire
Finnish anti-communists